Rajgangpur (Sl. No.: 13) is a Vidhan Sabha constituency of Sundargarh district, Odisha .
Area of this constituency includes Rajgangpur, Rajgangpur block, Lathikata block and part of Kutra block.

Elected Members

Fifteen elections held during 1951 to 2014. List of members elected from this constituency are:

2019: (13): C S Raazen Ekka (Congress)
2014: (13): Mangala Kisan (BJD)
2009: (13): Gregori Minj (Congress)
2004: (137): Gregori Minj (Congress)
2000: (137): Mangala Kisan (BJD)
1995: (137): Mangala Kisan (Janata Dal)
1990: (137): Mangala Kisan (Janata Dal)
1985: (137): Mangala Kisan (Janata Dal)
1980: (137): Mukharam Nayak (Congress-I)
1977: (137): Brajamohan Kisan (Janata Party)
1974: (137): Khristopher Ekka (Congress)
1971: (123): Ignes Majhi (Jhadkhand)
1967: (123): Premchand Bhagat (Ind.)
1961: (64): Rangaballabha Amat (Congress)
1957: (43): Santi Praksh Oram (Independent)
1951: (37): Agapit Lakra (Independent)

2019 Election Result
In 2019 election Indian National Congress candidate C S Raazen Ekka, defeated Biju Janata Dal candidate Mangala Kisan by 946 votes.

2014 Election Result
In 2014 election Biju Janata Dal candidate Mangala Kisan, defeated Indian National Congress candidate Gregory Minz by 10,036 votes.

2009 Election Result
In 2009 election Indian National Congress candidate Gregori Minj, defeated Biju Janata Dal candidate Benedikt Tirkey by 4,115 votes.

Notes

References

Sundergarh district
Assembly constituencies of Odisha